The Jo Stafford Show could refer to:

The Jo Stafford Show (1954 TV series), a 1954–55 American musical variety program 
The Jo Stafford Show (1961 TV series), a 1961 British variety television programme